Cannibalization or cannibalisation may refer to:
 Cannibalization (fiction), adapting, borrowing or stealing plots, characters, themes or ideas from one story for use in another or from one medium to another
 Cannibalization (marketing), the introduction of a new product that harms sales of an older product by the same producer
 Cannibalization (parts), the use of parts from one device to repair another

See also
 Cannibal (disambiguation)
 Cannibalism (disambiguation)